Wang Songling (born 1962) is a Chinese medical scientist and the current vice-president of the Capital University of Medical Sciences.

Biography
Wang was born in Xiangxiang, Hunan in 1962, to Wang Xianju, a farmer. He attended Wangxing School. He elementary studied at Dongjiao Middle School and secondary studied at Dongshan High School. After the resumption of college entrance examination, he graduated from Peking University Health Science Center in 1984. He did post-doctoral research at Tokyo Dental College from 1991 to 1992. He was a visiting scholar at National Institutes of Health (NIH; 1996–1998) and National Institute of Dental and Craniofacial Research (NIDCR; May 2001–September 2001).

In December 2017 He was elected a member of the Standing Committee of the 14th Central Committee of China Zhi Gong Party. In 2018 he became a member of the 13th National Committee of the Chinese People's Political Consultative Conference. In 2019，he became an academician of the Chinese Academy of Sciences.

Honours and awards
 2001 National Science Fund for Distinguished Young Scholars
 2017 Wu Jieping Medical Award 
 November 18, 2019 Medical Pharmacy Award of the Ho Leung Ho Lee Foundation
 November 22, 2019 Academician of the Chinese Academy of Sciences (CAS)

References

1962 births
People from Xiangxiang
Living people
Peking University alumni
Tokyo Dental College alumni
Members of the Chinese Academy of Sciences
China Zhi Gong Party politicians